Băița de sub Codru is a commune in Maramureș County, Crișana, Romania. It is composed of two villages, Băița de sub Codru and Urmeniș (Bükkörményes).

References

External links
Official site

Communes in Maramureș County
Localities in Crișana